Lodewijk de Kruif (born 7 October 1969) is a Dutch football coach and former professional player who manages VV DUNO.

Playing career
De Kruif made 19 league appearances for TOP Oss in the 1993-94 season.

Coaching career
After Samson Siasia left Nigerian club Heartland to manage the Nigerian national team, De Kruif was one of four European coaches named in December 2010 on the shortlist to replace him. He worked for the club as a Technical Advisor, leaving his role in May 2012 to return to the Netherlands for personal reasons. In January 2013, De Kruif was appointed manager of the Bangladesh national football team. He left the role in October 2014, although he was re-appointed briefly in January 2015 for the Bangabandhu Gold Cup. Earlier that month he had been appointed manager of amateur club VV DUNO.

References

1969 births
Living people
Dutch footballers
TOP Oss players
Eerste Divisie players
Association football defenders
Dutch football managers
Dutch expatriate football managers
Dutch expatriate sportspeople in Nigeria
Expatriate football managers in Nigeria
Dutch expatriate sportspeople in Bangladesh
Expatriate football managers in Bangladesh
Bangladesh national football team managers
People from Ede, Netherlands
Footballers from Gelderland